Bultfonteinite, originally dutoitspanite, is a pink to colorless mineral with chemical formula Ca2SiO2(OH,F)4. It was discovered in 1903 or 1904 in the Bultfontein mine in South Africa, for which the mineral is named, and described in 1932.

Description

Bultfonteinite is transparent and pale pink to colorless.

Structure
The crystal structure of bultfonteinite consists of strips of [Ca4Si2O4]8+, that run along the 5.67 Å c-axis, held together by Ca–O–Ca, Ca–F–Ca, Ca–H2O–Ca, and Ca–O–Si bonds. Silicon atoms occur in isolated tetrahedra and the calcium atoms have seven-fold coordination, derived from a triangular prism with a seventh atom present on one of the square faces.

History
In either 1903 or 1904, a miner discovered the first specimen of bultfonteinite on the 480-foot level of the Bultfontein mine in Kimberley, South Africa. The mineral occurred in a several-hundred-foot-tall horse of kimberlite-enclosed dolerite and shale fragments. The specimen, mistakenly thought to be natrolite, was given to Alpheus F. Williams. Several years later, additional samples were found by C. E. Adams in the nearby Dutoitspan mine and given to the MacGregor Museum in Kimberley.

After John Parry and F. E. Wright described the mineral afwillite in 1925, Williams recognized that his samples of bultfonteinite were not natrolite, but were likely a new mineral species. Chemical analysis by John Parry and crystallographic and optical determination by Wright proved it to be a new mineral. The mineral was described by Parry, Williams, and Wright in 1932 and named bultfonteinite. Their original description does not explicitly state the origin of the name, but it is presumably named after the mine in which it was discovered. Earlier that year in his book The Genesis of the Diamond, Williams had called the mineral dutoitspanite, a name which was "apparently discarded". When the International Mineralogical Association was founded, bultfonteinite was grandfathered as a valid mineral species.

The type material is held in England at Cambridge University and the Natural History Museum in London.

Occurrence
Bultfonteinite has been found in Australia, Botswana, Canada, Israel, Japan, Jordan, Russia, South Africa, and the United States. The mineral was first located outside South Africa in the US State of California in 1955. Bultfonteinite has been found in association with afwillite, apophyllite, calcite, natrolite, oyelite, scawtite, and xonotlite.

At the type locality, the mineral occurred in a large structure of dolerite and shale fragments in a kimberlite pipe. In Crestmore, California, bultfonteinite formed in the contact zone of thermally metamorphosed limestone.

References

Bibliography

External links

Calcium minerals
Triclinic minerals
Nesosilicates
Fluorine minerals
Crestmore Heights, California
Minerals in space group 2